Retail loss prevention (also known as Retail asset protection) is a set of practices employed by retail companies to preserve profit. Profit preservation is any business activity specifically designed to reduce preventable losses. A preventable loss is any business cost caused by deliberate or inadvertent human actions, colloquially known as "shrinkage". Loss prevention is mainly found within the retail sector but also can be found within other business environments.

Retail loss prevention is geared towards the elimination of preventable loss. Most companies take this traditional approach by either having their own in-house loss prevention team or using external security agencies.

Shrink
Items that are unaccounted for compared to what the inventory system believes the store should have are losses or "shrink". Shrink is caused by operational errors, internal theft, and external theft. Retail loss prevention is responsible for identifying these causes and following up with training, preventing, investigating, responding to and resolving them. According to the 2018 Federal National Retail Security Survey, the average Shrink % for US Retailers is 1.33%.

Global Shrink Rates
Average global shrink rates as table by region, ranging from a high of 1.85% in the US to a low of 1.75% in Asia Pacific.

Types of loss

Operational errors 
Operational errors are inadvertent human errors. Operational errors occur when associates do not follow existing business best practices and policies or a company lacks the proper best practices and policies to ensure work is performed with minimal human error. Operational errors also occur due to a lack of proper training for associates.

External theft 

External theft is when customers intentionally cause shrink by theft, fraud, or vandalism. Also known as Shoplifting, thefts that occur in retail settings are done during business hours and involve the lack of security and prevention measures. Theft prevention can be done by reducing the opportunity to steal in the store through placing prevention mechanisms in place.

Internal theft 
Internal theft is when company employees intentionally cause shrink by theft, fraud, vandalism, waste, abuse, or misconduct. Since associates have access to the entire building and during non-business hours, they are capable of costing the company substantial losses over a longer period of time.

Internal theft is typically identified by reporting systems, first-hand visual/CCTV surveillance or tips from coworkers. It frequently occurs via dishonest operation of the Point Of Sale (POS) system.

Internal theft traditionally causes more loss to a business than external theft due to the increased opportunity available to internal staff members. "A well-informed security superintendent of a nationwide chain of retail stores has estimated that it takes between forty and fifty shoplifting incidents to equal the annual loss caused by one dishonest individual inside an organization."

Internal loss 
Internal loss is caused by associates including internal theft. Examples of such losses include staff members stealing products, cashiers not ringing sales through the tills and keeping the payment for themselves, package pilferage, staff selling products at discounted prices as a third-party distributor, "sweethearting" by giving products for free to other parties by staff, colluding with maintenance staff or external contractors to steal products, and under-ringing merchandise on the tills for other parties so they end up paying less for the items. Internal loss, as with other forms of shrinkage, can be classified as either "malicious" or "non-malicious".

The malicious internal loss is shrinkage caused by individuals from within the business such as staff members and cleaning staff and anyone else involved internally in the company. Internal shrink accounted for 35 percent of shrink to businesses in 2011.

Non-malicious shrinkage can result from a number of operational failures within the business structure. The processing of returned or damaged stock, for example, can cause articles to be removed from inventory and discarded (which contributes directly to shrinkage) rather than sold at a discount, donated, returned to vendors for credit, or otherwise removed from inventory in a manner that minimizes financial loss.

Loss prevention methods

Apprehensions and Recoveries 
Most large retailers have in-store loss prevention employees who are trained to apprehend shoplifters. This can come in the form of uniformed security officers, undercover security, or both. Each state allows stores to apprehend and detain shoplifters under shopkeeper's privilege laws. Apprehensions are typically a last resort after attempts to recover merchandise fail. An attempt to recover merchandise is known as a recovery or a "burn" and is generally one of the primary job duties of loss prevention associates. Many retailers operate in-store loss prevention teams including Target, Walmart, Macy's, JCPenney, Nordstrom, and Sephora. Teams generally have anywhere from 1-15 individuals depending on location.

Security Tags

The development of electronic article surveillance (a magnetic device attached to the merchandise that would trigger an alarm if removed from the store, also called EAS) led to an increase in arrests; however, many cases have been dismissed due to lack of observation of the crime. A later effort, called "benefit denial" by Read Hayes, was intended to reduce the incentives for people to take the items by destroying the usefulness of items that were improperly removed from stores through the use of measures such as exploding dye packs (ink tags).

CCTV

CCTV (Closed Circuit Television) is the use of a surveillance system to record any theft or misconduct. It has been widely used all over the world and has affected the decrease in crime globally. It is used to strengthen the central control, responsiveness and crime combating capacity which increases the efficiency and effectiveness of the retail loss prevention methods and strategies.

See also 
 McAfee Institute
Package pilferage
 Package theft
 Retail
Revenue protection
 Shopkeeper's privilege
 Shoplifting
 Store detective
 Tamper resistance
 Marge Be Not Proud eleventh episode of the seventh season of the American animated television series The Simpsons which deals with this subject.

References

Further reading

External links 
 HowStuffWorks: How anti-shoplifting devices work

Retailing-related crime
Theft
Security
Protective service occupations